Shiv Ganga Vidya Mandir is a Senior, Secondary, Co-Ed, English-medium, CBSE-affiliated School of Allahabad, located in Sector F, Shantipuram, Phaphamau, Allahabad. Shiv Ganga Vidya Mandir was established by  Samaj Evam Paryavaran Vikas Sansthan in 2003 on the banks of the Ganga river in Allahabad.

Logo and motto 
The school logo is " ॐ " which is a symbol of spiritualism in Indian Culture and Civilization. The motto of the school is, "तमसो मा जयोतिर्गमय", taken from Vedas.  It means "O cosmic loving mother take us from Darkness to light." This school's values are based on humanism and the scientific quest for knowledge. This school is apolitical, but has a proclivity towards right wing nationalism, having roots in the Vedic Civilization of India.

Jurisdiction 
Shiv Ganga Vidya Mandir provides education to eligible students from nursery to class 12. In 10+2, the school offers humanity, biology and mathematics, with computer science, Hindi and physical activity as electives. The jurisdiction consists of Allahabad, Pratapgarh, Sultanpur, Basti, Faizabad, Rewa, Azamgarh, Kaushambi, and Bhadohi.

Infrastructure 
Shiv Ganga Vidya Mandir resides on 60 acres on the bank of Ganga river. 65 classrooms, five laboratories, and one auditorium hall are available. The school inhabits a three-story, arch-shaped building. Basketball, hockey, football, cricket, lawn tennis, horse riding, and rifle shooting are offered in accordance with CBSE Board rules.

Academic excellence 
Students won 14 gold medals in Academic Olympics. Many students scored 10 CGPA in High School Board Exam. Students have excelled in competitive exams. IN 2018 Shiv Ganga Vidya Mandir was made a centre by CBSE Board for conducting board exams.

Social harmony 
Shiv Ganga Vidya Mandir aims to create harmony in the multi-ethnic society of India. In year 2017 December 30, a grand celebration of Prakash Parv of Guru Gobind Singh was organized by students and faculty to note the sacrifice made by Guru Gobind Singh and his family. Samaj Evam Paryavaran Vikas Sansthan provides merit and means-based scholarships to poor students. Students organize annual functions to present cultural activities like dance, drama and music to represent various regions of India.

Conservation  
Shiv Ganga Vidya Mandir celebrated Earth Day on 22 April 2017. On Earth Day Prof Oblonokov Igor planted trees with the students. General Manager of Dainik Jagran gave an address. Pollution control and water conservation was the main theme.

On 21 March 2018 Sparrow Conservation week  was celebrated by faculty and students.

National initiatives 
Utistha:-International Vedic Summer Camp was organized under UNESCO supervision. This was a 10-day international Vedic camp.

Gyan Punj yojna has been started by poor students of the minority community who cannot afford formal education. It celebrates Hindu New year.

International initiatives 
Chandra Sekhar Azad Birthday has been celebrated in 18 countries on 23 July 2017 to promote fraternity and humanity. The school is conducts educational tours to countries like Russia. Shiv Ganga Vidya Mandir established an Indo-Russian Cultural Study Centre on 17 June 2018.

As part of the Learning Civil Avionics technology for peace, students will visit Russia to learn nuclear science and related technology.

Leadership 
It is run by Samaj Evam Paryavaran Vikashas Sansthan

References

High schools and secondary schools in Uttar Pradesh
Primary schools in Uttar Pradesh
Schools in Allahabad